The University of Kentucky J. David Rosenberg College of Law, also known as UK Rosenberg College of Law, is the law school of the University of Kentucky located in Lexington, Kentucky. Founded initially from a law program at Transylvania University in 1799, the law program at UK began operations in 1908; it was one of the nation's first public law schools. In 1913, the college became the first in the nation to institute a trial practice program, and is host to the tenth-oldest student-run law review publication in the United States. The dean of the College of Law is Mary J. Davis, who happens to be the first woman dean of the Rosenberg College of Law.

According to UK Law's official disclosures to the American Bar Association, nearly 86% of the Class of 2020 successfully obtained full-time, long-term, JD-required employment nine months after graduation, excluding solo practitioners. Per U.S. News & World Report, UK Law is the 67th best law school among all public and private universities in the nation, and the highest-ranked law school in the Commonwealth of Kentucky.

The University of Kentucky pass rate for the July 2021 Kentucky Bar Exam was 83%, 11% higher than the overall Kentucky pass rate. For first-time takers the pass rate was 83%, 6% higher than the overall first-time taker pass rate in Kentucky.

Academics

The Rosenberg College of Law offers a three-year, full-time program leading to a Juris Doctor (J.D.) degree. Students in addition can choose to pursue their J.D. in conjunction with another graduate degree, such as a master's degree. The College offers a dual degree program that includes many different fields of study that includes: JD-MA, JD-MBA, JD/MHA (Master of Health Administration), and JD-MPA.

Required first-year courses for 1L's are Torts, Criminal law, Contracts, legal research and writing, constitutional law, civil procedure, and property. All first-year students are required to complete the historic 1L Oral argument at the conclusion of their first year in their Legal Writing course acting as a hallmark event in each students legal career and their very first oral argument.

History
The University of Kentucky College of Law began operations in 1908.  It was housed in a structure now known as the Gillis Building from 1927 to 1936. In 1936, the college moved into the newly built Lafferty Hall.  Lafferty Hall was named after William T. Lafferty, the first dean of the College of Law.

In 1913, the college began publication of the Kentucky Law Journal.  The KLJ is the tenth-oldest student-run law journal in continuous publication in America.

In 1925, the college was approved by the American Bar Association, and it was elected to the Order of the Coif in 1931.

The College of Law again relocated to its current building located on South Limestone in 1965. That building underwent a major renovation and expansion during 2017-2019, during which the building was taken down to its structural core and completely reconfigured.

On Feb. 1, 2017, Chief Justice John G. Roberts, Jr. spoke at the College of Law and served as the first speaker of the judicial conference and speaker series hosted by UK Law apart of the Heyburn Initiative. Most recently, on Sept. 21, 2017, Justice Neil Gorsuch, Associate Justice of the Supreme Court of the United States spoke at UK Law and provided advice to UK Law students in small intimate groups. Serving as only the most recent U.S. Supreme Court Justice to speak at the College of Law, going back to 1989 UK Law hosted the sixth biennial Judge Mac Swinford Lecture where Supreme Court Justice Antonin Scalia delivered the lecture. The five prior notable speakers of that series at UK Law were Judge Robert Keeton (1980), U.S. Supreme Court Chief Justice William Rehnquist (1982), U.S. Supreme Court Justice Sandra Day O'Connor (1984), and Former U.S. Attorney General Griffin Bell (1986).

The college was renamed the J. David Rosenberg College of Law in 2019 after prominent Ohio corporate lawyer and alumnus J. David Rosenberg (J.D. '73), donated $20 million to the college. The gift was the third largest single donation in university history and earned him the name rights to the school, it also went toward further strengthening the academic excellence of the College of Law by supporting scholarships for outstanding students and efforts to recruit and retain world-class faculty.

Law building
Constructed in 1965, the University of Kentucky College of Law Building houses the Alvin E. Evans Library, classrooms, and faculty offices. .

The Alvin E. Evans Library is the largest law library in the Commonwealth and contains approximately 470,000 volumes, along with a vast array of electronic materials. It also provides access to all "U.S. reported court decisions, statutes and administrative materials" along with international materials.

A 2002 study suggested that if a new College of Law structure was to be constructed, it should relocate closer to downtown Lexington. The suggested site was a block or two north, on Scott Street near the College of Education. A plan for five structures and two courtyards was abandoned because of funding difficulties. Instead, the school decided to renovate and expand its current building, a $56 million project, with state bonds paying $35 million on the condition that tuition not go up as a result. The renovation and expansion was completed in 2019.

Employment
According to University of Kentucky's official 2020 ABA-required disclosures, 86% of the Class of 2020 obtained full-time, long-term, JD-required employment nine months after graduation, excluding solo practitioners. University of Kentucky's Law School Transparency under-employment score is 5.4%, indicating the percentage of the Class of 2020 unemployed, pursuing an additional degree, or working in a non-professional, short-term, or part-time job nine months after graduation.

Costs
The total cost of attendance (indicating the cost of tuition, fees, books and living expenses) at University of Kentucky for the 2020-2021 academic year is $44,321 for residents and $71,108 for non-residents.

Notable alumni

 Andy Barr '01, U.S. Representative
 Steve Beshear '68, former Kentucky governor
 Edward T. Ned Breathitt '50, former Kentucky governor
 Stephen Bright '74, advocate and law school lecturer
 John Y. Brown, Sr. '26, former U.S. Representative 
 John Y. Brown, III '92, former Secretary of State of Kentucky
 David L. Bunning '91, U.S. District Judge
 Karen K. Caldwell '80, U.S. District Judge
 Albert B. "Happy" Chandler '24, former Governor of Kentucky, U.S. Senator and Commissioner of Baseball
 Ben Chandler '86, U.S. Representative
 Jennifer B. Coffman '78, U.S. District Judge
 Bert T. Combs '37, former Governor of Kentucky and Federal Judge
 Joe Craft '76, businessman and philanthropist
 Mike Duncan '74, chairman of the Republican National Committee
 Karl Spillman Forester '66, U.S. District Judge
 Joseph Robert Goeke '75, Senior Federal Judge
 John G. Heyburn II '76, U.S. District Judge
 Joseph Martin Hood '72, U.S. District Judge
 James E. Keller '66, Justice of the Kentucky Supreme Court
 Robert G. Lawson '63, law professor
 Mitch McConnell '67, U.S. senator
 Jim Newberry '81, former Mayor of Lexington, Kentucky
 Mary C. Noble '81, former Justice of the Kentucky Supreme Court
 Timothy N. Philpot '77, former Ky. State Senator and family court circuit judge in Fayette Co.
 Hal Rogers '64, U.S. Representative
 Ernesto Scorsone '76, former Ky. State Senator and court circuit judge in Fayette Co.
 Aurelia Skipwith, 15', Director of the U.S. Fish and Wildlife Service
 Janet Stumbo '80, Justice of the Kentucky Supreme Court
 David Tandy '98, former member of the Louisville Metro Council
 Gregory Frederick Van Tatenhove '89, U.S. District Judge
 Ed Whitfield '69, U.S. Representative
 Henry Rupert Wilhoit, Jr. '60, U.S. District Judge

Extracurricular activities
Kentucky College of Law has numerous active student organizations, including:
Organizations devoted to interest in a specific area of law (international law, tax law, public interest Law, sports & entertainment law, business law, criminal law, intellectual property law, etc).
Political and social organizations (OUTLaw, American constitution society on law & policy, etc). 
 UK Law chapter of the Federalist Society.
Community service organizations (street law, law wellness initiative, volunteer income tax assistance (VITA), etc).
Organization for students with a common background (asian pacific american law student association, black law students association, christian legal society, latino law student association, law student veterans organization, etc).

The Rosenberg College of Law has a mock trial team, which competes nationally. Additionally, it has several moot court teams. Both mock trial and moot court teams are historically responsible for the College of Law's tradition of excellence in trial advocacy.

The Rosenberg College of Law publishes the following law reviews:
The Kentucky Law Journal the university's historically renowned flagship publication that is the tenth oldest law review published in the United States which has had a continuous publication since 1881.
The Kentucky Journal of Equine, Agriculture, and Natural Resources Law (KJEANRL) a multi-disciplinary journal of law, science, and policy.

Images

See also
 Buildings at the University of Kentucky

References

External links
 College of Law

Kentucky
Law
1799 establishments in Kentucky
Natural resources law